The 2007–08 Lega Basket Serie A season, known as the Serie A TIM for sponsorship reasons, was the 86th season of the Lega Basket Serie A, the highest professional basketball league in Italy.

The regular season ran from September 30, 2007 to April 27, 2008, 18 teams played 34 games each. At the end of the regular season, the top 8 teams made the play-offs whilst the lowest ranked teams, Cimberio Varese and Legea Scafati, were relegated to the Legadue.

Montepaschi Siena won their 3rd title by winning the playoff finals series against Lottomatica Roma.

Teams

Regular season

* Legea Scafati was penalized by 7 points for administrative irregularities

Playoffs

Coppa Italia

External links
 Serie A official website 

Lega Basket Serie A seasons
1
Italy